The 2014 season was Persib Bandung's 55th season in the club football history, the 18th consecutive season in the top-flight Liga Indonesia season and the 6th season competing in the Indonesia Super League.

Persib became the champion of the 2014 Indonesia Super League and Ferdinand Sinaga was rewarded the best player award.

Review and events

Pre-2014

September
2013 Persib Bandung season ends after Persib's failure to qualify in the final round of 2013 Menpora Cup.

After a coaching evaluation meeting on 27 September 2013, PT PBB declared that head coach Djajang Nurdjaman will still lead the team for at least a season at the 2014 Indonesia Super League.

October

Persib evaluated their coaching staff. The results are the declaration on 17 October 2013 which appointed Jaino Matos as match analyst, extending Anwar Sanusi's contract as goalkeeper coach, extending Asep Sumantri's contracts and replacing Sutiono Lamso with Herrie Setyawan as assistant coaches, as well as appointing a psychologist for the team.

Persib then released seven players from previous season's squad, four of them are the foreign players. Those are two Bandung players Cecep Supriatna and Aang Suparman, long-time player Airlangga Sutjipto, centre-back Abanda Herman, and midfielder Mbida Messi, Kenji Adachihara and Hilton Moreira. Following their departure are goalkeeper Rizky Bagja and midfielder Asri Akbar, who left to get more playing time.

On 6 October 2013, Persib recruited two Sriwijaya FC players, Tantan and Achmad Jufriyanto. Persib also recruited two ex-Persib Junior players. Those are Persisam Samarinda player, Ferdinand Sinaga on 16 October 2013, and Arema Indonesia player, Muhammad Natshir on 29 October 2013.

November

On 1 November 2013, long-time player Maman Abdurrahman stated that he will leave Persib due to private issues. Persib then proceeded to release another defender, Naser Al Sebai on 8 November 2013 due to the competition's new regulation of foreign players.

Also on 1 November 2013, Persib recruited two Malian players from PS Barito Putera, midfielder Makan Konaté and striker Djibril Coulibaly. Another Sriwijaya FC player, Abdul Rahman Sulaiman, was recruited by Persib on 23 November 2013 to cover Maman Abdurrahman's leave. Persib also recruited two out of the proposed three intern players, which are Rudiyana and Syaeful Anwar. On 3 November 2013, Persib officially recruited Persebaya Surabaya midfielder, Muhammad Taufiq.

Brazilian defender Gesio Carvalho is recruited by Persib to follow a trial from 2 November 2013 until 9 November 2013. He ended up not recruited by Persib.

Persib started to perfect the team by running some friendly matches. Two friendly matches were done in November. The first one was a 1–1 draw with Persib Bandung U-21 in Jalak Harupat Soreang Stadium on 9 November 2013. Persib's goal was scored by top-scorer Sergio van Dijk. The second friendly match was a 6–0 win against Persikab Kabupaten Bandung in Galuh Stadium. This friendly was a part of their training center in Ciamis. Four of Persib's goals were scored by van Dijk, while the other two were scored by two new recruits, Konaté and Jufriyanto.

Persib Bandung finished all 20 players' contracts on 29 November 2013. Four players still have contracts from the previous season, which are Sergio van Dijk, Jajang Sukmara, Tony Sucipto, and Atep. Four players were given two years contracts, which are Ferdinand Sinaga, Muhammad Taufiq, Shahar Ginanjar, and Muhammad Natshir. The other twelve players were given one year contracts.

December

On 8 December 2013, Persib's manager Umuh Muchtar stated that Persib's top-scorer Sergio van Dijk will leave the club due to unsatisfying contract fee.

On 11 December 2013, Persib contracted Montenegrin defender Vladimir Vujović for a year long contract.

Persib Bandung continued to perfect the team by running more friendly matches. Four friendly matches were done in December 2013. The first one was a 2–2 draw against Premier Division team PSGC Galuh Ciamis still in a part of the training center in Ciamis. The two goals were scored by Konaté and Abdul Rahman. However, the match was stopped at the 70th minute due to overcrowd. Persib run their second friendly against the US Major League Soccer team D.C. United as a part of their Indonesian Tour. The result were a 2–1 win for Persib with Konaté and Firman Utina scored each a goal. The third friendly match was a 3–1 win against Porda Purwakarta in PPI Field. Two goals were scored by Coulibaly, while the other one by Atep. The last friendly match on December was a big 9–1 win against Benfica Karawang. Muhammad Ridwan and Coulibaly scored each two goals. The other five goals were scored by Konaté, Atep, Vujović, Sinaga, and Utina.

Persib was invited by East Java Football Association to join 2013 East Java Tournament as an invitee team along with Sriwijaya FC and PSM Makassar. Persib joined the tournament and grouped with Persepam Madura United and Persebaya Surabaya, playing in Bangkalan. In the first game against Persepam, Persib won 2–1. The goals were scored by Coulibaly and Supardi. In the second game, Persib lost 0–1 against Persebaya. Persib failed to continue to the semi-finals as the best runner-up was achieved by Persela Lamongan. On 25 December 2013, Persib was offered to join 2013 Piala Sultan in Banjarmasin, but on 27 December 2013, Persib declined the offer.

On 23 December 2013, PSSI announced that the 2014 Indonesia Super League will be divided into two groups. Persib was drawn into the Western Group, consisting of Arema Cronous, Barito Putera, Gresik United, Pelita Bandung Raya, Persija Jakarta, Persijap Jepara, Persik Kediri, Persita Tangerang, Semen Padang, Sriwijaya FC, and Persib Bandung.

January

Persib continued to perfect the team by running more friendly matches. The first match was a big 9–0 win against Persib Bandung U-21. Sinaga and Konaté scored each two goals, while the other five was scored by Jufriyanto, Tantan, Sigit Hermawan, Rudiyana, and Taufiq. The second friendly match of the month was a 7–1 win against Porda Kabupaten Bandung. Sinaga scored a hattrick, Konaté scored two goals, and the other two goals were scored by Utina and Rudiyana. The last friendly before the ISL was a 4–0 win against Thai Raj Pracha. Two goals were scored by Tantan, and the other two were scored by Rudiyana and Konaté.

On 5 January 2014, manager Umuh Muchtar had agreed for Persib to contract the three intern players to be played in the 2014 Indonesia Super League. The three players are Rudiyana, Syaeful Anwar and Rudi Gunawan. Manager Umuh Muchtar also stated that Persib might extend Makan Konaté's contract to three years due to his good performances in the pre-season matches.

On 16 January 2014, Persib released the Malian striker Djibril Coulibaly due to his injury causing bad performances in pre-season matches. Djibril Coulibaly is replaced by a Nigerian striker Udo Fortune on the same day. However, Fortune was released by Persib on 23 January 2014 due to disappointing performances in the Inter Island Cup. After running trials for Liberian striker, Roberto Kwateh and Émile Mbamba, Persib decided to recall Djibril Coulibaly on 31 January 2014.

After continuing the partnership with League for the apparel, Persib gained new partnership on 12 January 2014 with PT MASA, a local tire company, and their products, Corsa Motorcycle Tire and Achilles Radial.

On 1 January 2014, Persib was appointed by PT Liga Indonesia to be the host for the Group Java 1 in the 2014 Indonesian Inter Island Cup qualification, whereas only the group winner will be advanced to the final round. Persib Bandung was grouped with Persita Tangerang, Persijap Jepara, and Pelita Bandung Raya. Group 1 will play in Jalak Harupat Soreang Stadium from 13 to 16 January 2014. On the first matchday against Persita, Persib won 7–1. Atep, who had only played from 71st minute, scored a hattrick. The other four goals were scored by Jufriyanto, Coulibaly, Utina and Konaté. On the second matchday, Persib continues to get a win from Persijap. Persib won 2–0 with goals scored by Ridwan and Sinaga. On the last matchday, Persib won 1–0 in the Derby van Java against Pelita Bandung Raya. The only goal was scored by Jufriyanto. The match was rained with yellow cards as each sides received four yellow cards. Persib then advanced to the final round, grouped with Persik Kediri, Mitra Kukar, and Persiram Raja Ampat. The group played the game in Manahan Stadium, Surakarta from 19 to 22 January 2014. On the first matchday of Group B, Persib had a goalless draw with Persiram. On the second matchday against Mitra Kukar, Persib gets a 1–1 draw. Striker Udo Fortune scored his only goal for Persib in the season. On the last matchday, Persib defeated Persik 3–2. Left behind 2 goals, Persib strikes with three goals each by Konaté, Sinaga and Ridwan. With this win, Persib advances to the final against Group A winner, Arema Cronous. However, the finals that was supposed to be held on 25 January 2014 in Sidoarjo, was postponed because the police didn't give permission, concerning the vicious rivalries between the club's supporters.

February

On 2 February 2014, Persib won their first ISL match after defeating Sriwijaya 1–0 in Jalak Harupat Stadium. Konaté scored the winning goal by a penalty. Persib won again after defeating Persita Tangerang 2–1 on 5 February 2014. Left 0–1, Sinaga scored equalizer goal, while Konaté scored the winning goal by a penalty again. Their first away game on 9 February 2014 ended up as a 1–1 draw against Persijap Jepara. Persib's goal was an own goal by Persijap's defender Catur Rintang. The fourth matchday on 12 February 2014 resulted in Persib defeating Persik Kediri in their home with a 3–0 win. Persib's goal was scored by Jufriyanto, Coulibaly, and Atep. Persib received their first loss at their home on 16 February 2014 by Semen Padang with score 1–2. Persib's only goal was scored by Coulibaly.

On 13 February 2014, Persib officially contract the intern player, Rudiyana for a year-long contract. Persib continues to fill their foreign player quota by running a trial for Australian striker Jacob Colosimo on 14 February 2014. He ended up not recruited by Persib. Persib then runs a trial for Saudi Arabian striker Fahad Al-Dossari from 19 to 22 February 2014, but ended up not recruiting him. On 26 February 2014, Persib runs a trial for South Korean striker Han Dong-Won. Persib then decided not to have any additional foreign player after releasing Han.

Persib runs a friendly match against local football team, IM UD Rahayu due to the cancellation of Persib-Persija match that was scheduled to take place on 22 February 2014. Persib won 8–0 with Hermawan and Rudiyana scored two goals, while Abdul Rahman, Tantan, Atep and Coulibaly each scored a goal.

March
Seven Persib players were called to represent the Indonesia national football team for a match against Saudi Arabia on the 2015 AFC Asian Cup qualification and the first phase of the 2014 AFF Suzuki Cup training camp on Alzira, Valencia, Spain. Those players are Made, Supardi, Jufriyanto, Utina, Ridwan, Sinaga and Tantan.

Persib was planning to run a friendly match against Malaysia Super League team T–Team F.C. on 1 March 2014 to fill the empty dates due to 2015 AFC Asian Cup qualification. But after rescheduled to 3 March 2014 due to T–Team's unpreparedness, the game is cancelled due to Persib's unpreparedness. Replacing this game is a match against local team, UNI. Persib won 10–0, with three goals by Rudiyana, two goals each by Konaté and Coulibaly. The other three goals were scored by Tantan, Jajang, and Vujović. Their second friendly of the month on 26 March 2014 resulted in a 5–0 win against Pelita Bandung Raya U-21. Two goals were scored by Rudiyana, and three others by Atep, Agung and Konaté. The team won another friendly match on 29 March 2014 against local team PS Setia with 4–1 score. Two goals were scored by Atep, and the other two by Sigit And Rudiyana.

On their only ISL match in March, Persib won 2–0 against PS Barito Putera on their ground. The two goals were scored by the ex-Barito, Djibril Coulibaly.

April
On 2 April 2014, Persib run a friendly that ended up as a 3–3 draw against First Division team, Persibat Batang. Two goals and one goal were scored by Rudiyana and Agung, respectively. Then, from 3 to 5 April 2014, Persib held a training center at Pangandaran. There, they played a friendly against local players under the name Pangandaran Selection. Seven goals were scored by Konaté while the other two scored by Taufiq and Agung.

On 8 April 2014, Persib was visited by Gamba Osaka representatives to check the Jalak Harupat Stadium's worthiness as they would visit Indonesia for a friendly match in June 2014.

On 10 April 2014, Polda Jabar initiated a reconciliation to avoid unnecessary future clashes of Persib and Persija's rivalry. This meeting concluded with six agreements that will be the ground rule if one or both sides broke the agreements on future dates.

On the first April matchday on 13 April 2014, Persib dramatically won 3–2 against Arema Cronus. The goals were scored by Coulibaly, Utina, and Konaté. On 20 April 2014, Persib won 4–1 in Gresik. Two goals were scored by Sinaga, while the other two by Ridwan and Atep. The match was postponed for 15 minutes due to flares lit by the supporters. On the next match, Persib lost 1–0 at the Bandung Derby to Pelita Bandung Raya on 27 April 2014.

May
On 4 May 2014, Persib run a friendly match against local team Bone FC, which ended up as a 9–0 win for them. Four goals were made by Coulibaly, two goals each by Atep and Rudiyana, and a goal by Tantan. Then on 14 May 2014, Persib played a friendly against 2013–14 Eredivisie champions, AFC Ajax as a part of their 2014 Indonesian Tour. The game resulted in a 1–1 draw with Konaté scored Persib's lone goal.

Persib had a goalless draw against Persija Jakarta on their last game of the ISL first round on 8 May 2014. This game marks the 9th draw on the Old Indonesia derby since the Liga Indonesia era. On the first match of the ISL second round, Persib had a 2–2 draw in the Bandung Derby against Pelita Bandung Raya on 20 May 2014. Tantan and Sinaga scored a goal each. They had another 2–2 draw against Arema Cronus on 25 May 2014 in Kanjuruhan. Striker Ferdinand Sinaga scored the goals. They received their first win in the second round against Gresik United with 4–1 score. Firman Utina, Makan Konaté, Ferdinand Sinaga, and Djibril Coulibaly scored each a goal.

Persib runs a trial for Japanese striker Atsushi Yonezawa on 27 May 2014.

June
On 2 June 2014, Persib decided not to add any players on the ISL second round after releasing Atsushi Yonezawa.

Persib runs a friendly against Persima Majalengka on 5 June 2014 which ended up as a 13–1 win. Two goals scored each by Coulibaly, Rudiyana and Sigit Hermawan, and the rest by Sinaga, Utina, Tantan, Vujović, Abdul Rahman, Jufriyanto, and Atep. However, their long-planned friendly against Gamba Osaka was canceled in honor of the presidential election.

Their last ISL game before the long break was a 3–1 win against Barito Putera on 10 June 2014 in Bandung. Makan Konaté scored two goals to his former club, with one additional goal by Ferdinand Sinaga.

Five Persib players were called up to the national team to international friendlies against Pakistan U-23 and Nepal, which are I Made Wirawan, Achmad Jufriyanto, Firman Utina, Hariono and Tantan.

July
On the first friendly on the long break, Persib won 3–0 to Bara Siliwangi FC in Pusdikpom Field. The game was played 40x2 minutes, with an own goal by Bara's defender and two goals each by Ridwan and Vujović. On the second friendly match, Persib won 9–0 in Pusdikpom Field against Benpica Karawang. Vujović scored a quattrick, three of them were penalty kicks, Coulibaly scored a hattrick and a goal each by Sigit and Atep.

Five Persib players were called back by the national team to a friendly against Qatar on 14 July 2014 in Doha. All of the previous players were called except for Tantan, who is replaced with Ferdinand Sinaga after his detention is lifted.

Matches

Legend

Friendlies

Indonesia Super League

First round

Second round

Knockout stage

Squad

Sources:

Transfers

In

Out

Statistics

Clean sheets 
As of end of season.

Overall 
As of end of season.

References

External links 
 2014 Persib Bandung season at ligaindonesia.co.id 
 2014 Persib Bandung season at persib.co.id 
 2014 Persib Bandung season at soccerway.com

Persib Bandung
Persib Bandung
Persib Bandung seasons